Cabo Carvoeiro (Cape Carvoeiro) is cape which lies on the Atlantic coast, along the westernmost point of the Peniche Peninsula, in the civil parish of  Peniche, Leiria District, Portugal.
Opposite to the Berlengas archipelago, the cape is integrated into a natural terrestrial and maritime reserve, in the vicinity of Furninha, a site known for the discovery of prehistoric remains suggesting human occupation since the Neolithic.

See also
 Lighthouse of Cabo Carvoeiro

Centro Region

Carvoeiro